Daphnella pulchra is an extinct species of sea snail, a marine gastropod mollusc in the family Raphitomidae.

Description
The length of the shell attains 13 mm.

Distribution
Fossils of this marine species were found in Miocene strata in Aquitaine, France.

References

pulchra
Gastropods described in 1932